South Africa is a nation that competed at four consecutive Hopman Cup tournaments and first competed in the 5th annual staging in 1993. They won the event in 2000 and were also the runners-up three years earlier in 1997.

Players
This is a list of players who have played for South Africa in the Hopman Cup.

Results

1 In the 1997 tie against Switzerland, South Africa's two points came as a result of the male Swiss competitor, Marc Rosset,  withdrawing from his singles match and being unable to compete in the mixed doubles due to injury.
2 In the 1999 tie against Zimbabwe, the South African team conceded one point as a result of their choice not to compete in the mixed doubles.

References

Hopman Cup teams
Hopman Cup